Simmonds Peak is a  tall rock peak standing 4 miles (6 km) south of Mount Dort on the east side of Amundsen Glacier in the Queen Maud Mountains. It was mapped by United States Geological Survey (USGS) from surveys and U.S. Navy air photos, 1960–64. It was named by Advisory Committee on Antarctic Names (US-ACAN) after Willard I. Simmonds Jr., biologist, McMurdo Station winter party, 1964.

Queen Maud Mountains
Mountains of the Ross Dependency
Amundsen Coast